Bette Nesmith Graham (March 23, 1924 – May 12, 1980) was an American typist, commercial artist, and the inventor of the correction fluid Liquid Paper.  She was the mother of musician and producer Michael Nesmith of The Monkees.

Biography
Born in 1924 in Dallas, Texas, Bette Graham dropped out of high school at the age of seventeen and went to secretarial school. By 1951, she had worked her way up to the position of executive secretary for W.W. Overton, the Chairman of the Board of the Texas Bank and Trust. It was at this time that Graham and her colleagues at the bank began experiencing trouble with the new IBM electric typewriters. Tired of having to retype entire pages because of one small error, Graham determined to find a more efficient alternative. Little did she know her frustration would lead to her becoming one of the most famous women inventors of the 20th century.

Career
The impetus for Graham's breakthrough came as she observed painters decorating the bank windows for the holidays. Rather than remove their mistakes entirely, the painters simply covered any imperfections with an additional layer. The quick-thinking Graham mimicked their technique by using a white, water-based tempera paint to cover her typing errors.

When the other secretaries realized how well the invention worked, they flooded Graham with requests for their own supplies. The inventor sold her first batch of "Mistake Out" in 1956, and soon she was working full-time to produce and bottle it from her North Dallas home. Her son Michael – who would later achieve fame as a member of the pop group The Monkees – and his friends helped to fill the growing number of orders for Mistake Out.

Graham continued experimenting with the makeup of the substance until she achieved the perfect combination of paint and several other chemicals. The refined product was renamed "Liquid Paper" in 1958 and, amid soaring demand, Graham applied for a patent and a trademark that same year.

Graham's Liquid Paper Company experienced tremendous growth over the next decade. By 1967, the company had its own corporate headquarters and automated production plant, and sales were in excess of one million units per year. In 1975, Graham moved operations into a 35,000-sq. ft. international Liquid Paper headquarters building in Dallas. Eventually, 
She opted to sell the company to Gillette Corporation for over $47.5 million in 1979. Following this success and massive growth in wealth, Graham would go on to establish two foundations, the Gihon Foundation, which gave grants and financial support to promote women in the arts,  and the Bette Clair McMurray Foundation, which did the same for women in business. She later died shortly after on May 12, 1980 due to complications of a stroke. She left her fortune to her son, who took over her foundations that empower striving women.

Impact
Graham’s impact on her revolutionary invention, “Liquid Paper” shows its relevance through its longevity of use to even today. From its fruition in 1956, Graham’s invention is now in virtually every office desk and supply cabinet around the world. The substance, Liquid Paper, the correction fluid relieves writers of all stripes from the pressure of perfection.

Management style
From the start, Graham ran her company with a unique combination of spirituality, egalitarianism, and pragmatism. Raised a Baptist, Graham converted to Christian Science in 1942, and this faith inspired the development of her corporate "Statement of Policy". Part code of ethics, part business philosophy, it covered everything from her belief in a "Supreme Being" to a focus on decentralized decision making and an emphasis on product quality over the pursuit of profit. She also believed that women could bring a more nurturing and humanistic quality to the male world of business, and provided a greenbelt with a fish pond, an employee library, and a childcare center in her new company headquarters in 1975.

Legacy
Her only son, musician Michael Nesmith (best known as a member of The Monkees), inherited half of his mother's estate of over $50 million. A portion financed the Gihon Foundation which established the Council on Ideas, a think tank with a retreat center located north of Santa Fe, New Mexico active from 1990 to 2000 and devoted to exploring world problems. Additionally, a portion of Graham's estate financed the Betty Clair McMurray Foundation, which focuses on supporting projects such as the exhibit Texas Women, A Celebration of History, career guidance for unwed mothers, shelter and counseling for battered women, and college scholarships for mature women. As part of its effort to acknowledge prominent people who had been previously overlooked, in 2018 The New York Times published a belated obituary for her.

References

Further reading

External links
Bette Nesmith Graham, Liquid Paper Inventor

1924 births
1980 deaths
20th-century American inventors
20th-century American musicians
American Christian Scientists
People from Dallas
Secretaries
The Monkees
Women inventors